The Emirate of Bukhara was a Muslim polity in Central Asia that existed from 1785 to 1920 in what is modern-day Uzbekistan, Tajikistan, Turkmenistan and Kazakhstan. It occupied the land between the Amu Darya and Syr Darya rivers, known formerly as Transoxiana. Its core territory was the fertile land along the lower Zarafshon river, and its urban centres were the ancient cities of Samarqand and the emirate's capital, Bukhara. It was contemporaneous with the Khanate of Khiva to the west, in Khwarazm, and the Khanate of Kokand to the east, in Fergana. In 1920, it ended with the establishment of the Bukharan People's Soviet Republic.

History

The Emirate of Bukhara was officially created in 1785, upon the assumption of rulership by the Manghit emir, Shah Murad. Shahmurad, formalized the family's dynastic rule (Manghit dynasty), and the khanate became the Emirate of Bukhara.

As one of the few states in Central Asia after the Mongol Empire not ruled by descendants of Genghis Khan (besides the Timurids), it staked its legitimacy on Islamic principles rather than Genghisid blood, as the ruler took the Islamic title of Emir instead of Khan. In the 18th-19th centuries, Khwarazm (Khiva Khanate) was ruled by the Uzbek dynasty of Kungrats.

Over the course of the 18th century, the emirs had slowly gained effective control of the Khanate of Bukhara, from their position as ataliq; and by the 1740s, when the khanate was conquered by Nadir Shah of Persia, it was clear that the emirs held the real power. From then on the emirs allowed puppet khans to rule until, following the death of Abu l-Ghazi Khan, Shah Murad assumed the throne openly.

Fitzroy Maclean recounts in Eastern Approaches how Charles Stoddart and Arthur Conolly were executed by Nasrullah Khan in the context of The Great Game, and how Joseph Wolff, known as the Eccentric Missionary, escaped their fate when he came looking for them in 1845. He was wearing his full canonical costume, which caused the Emir to burst out laughing, and "Dr Wolff was eventually suffered to leave Bokhara, greatly to the surprise of the populace, who were not accustomed to such clemency."

In 1868, the emirate lost a war with Imperial Russia, which had aspirations of conquest in the region. Russia annexed much of the emirate's territory, including the important city of Samarkand. In 1873, the remainder became a Russian protectorate, and was soon surrounded by the Governorate-General of Turkestan.

Reformists within the Emirate had found the conservative emir, Mohammed Alim Khan, unwilling to loosen his grip on power, and had turned to the Russian Bolshevik revolutionaries for military assistance. The Red Army launched an unsuccessful assault in March 1920, and then a successful one in September of the same year. The Emirate of Bukhara was conquered by the Bolsheviks and replaced with the Bukharan People's Soviet Republic. Today, the territory of the defunct emirate lies mostly in Uzbekistan, with parts in Tajikistan, Turkmenistan and Kazakhstan. In the first half of the 19th century it had some influence in northern Afghanistan, as the emirs of the Chahar Wilayat (Maimana, Sheberghan, Andkhui, Sar-i Pol) nominally accepted Bukharan suzerainty.

Culture 
In the era of the Manghyt emirs in Bukhara, a large construction of madrasahs, mosques and palaces was carried out. 
Located along important trading routes, Bukhara enjoyed a rich cultural mixture, including Persian, Uzbek, and Jewish influences.

A local school of historians developed in the Bukhara emirate. The most famous historians were Mirza Shams Bukhari, Muhammad Yakub ibn Daniyalbiy, Muhammad Mir Olim Bukhari, Ahmad Donish, Mirza Abdalazim Sami, Mirza Salimbek.

The city of Bukhara has a rich history of Persian architecture and literature, traditions that were continued into the Emirate Period. Prominent artists of the period include the poet Kiromi Bukhoroi, the calligrapher Mirza Abd al-Aziz Bukhari and the scholar Rahmat-Allah Bukhari. Throughout this period, the madrasahs of the region were renowned.

Administrative and territorial structure 

Administratively, the Emirate was divided into several beyliks or bekliks:
 Baljuvon, (now Khatlon Region, Tajikistan).
 Hisar, (now Tajikistan)
 Burdalik, (now Lebap Region, Turkmenistan)
 Guzar, (now Qashqadaryo Region, Uzbekistan)
 Charjuy, (now Lebap Region, Turkmenistan)
 Darvaz, (c 1878, now Darvaz district, Tajikistan)
 Dehnav, (now Surxondaryo Region, Uzbekistan)
 Kabakli, (now Lebap Region, Turkmenistan)
 Karakul, (now Bukhara Region, Uzbekistan)
 Karategin, (now Rasht district, Tajikistan)
 Karshi, (now Qashqadaryo Region, Uzbekistan)
 Kattakurgan, (now Samarkand region, Uzbekistan)
 Kulyab, (now Khatlon Region, Tajikistan)
 Karshi, (now Qashqadaryo Region, Uzbekistan)
 Kerki, (now Lebap Region, Turkmenistan)
 Nurata, (now Navoiy Region, Uzbekistan)
 Panjikent, (now Sughd province, Tajikistan)
 Rushan, (now Gorno-Badakhshan Autonomous region, Tajikistan)
 Samarkand, (now Samarqand Region, Uzbekistan — part of Russia since 1868 
 Shahrisabz, (c 1870, now Kashkadarya Region, Uzbekistan)
 Urgut, (now Samarqand Region, Uzbekistan)
 Falgar, (now Sughd province, Tajikistan)

Amirs/Emirs of Bukhara (1785–1920)

Pink Rows denote progenitor chiefs serving as Tutors (Ataliqs) & Viziers to the Khans of Bukhara.
Green Rows denote chiefs who took over reign of government from the Janids and placed puppet Khans.
A photo of Mohammed Alim Khan, final emir 1911-1920, is shown at Emir.

See also 
 Timeline of the Uzbeks

References

Bibliography

Literature
 Malikov A., The Russian conquest of the Bukharan Emirate: military and diplomatic aspects in Central Asian Survey, Volume 33, issue 2, 2014, p. 180-198

External links

 
1785 establishments in Asia
1920 disestablishments in Russia
Former countries in Central Asia
Former emirates
Former monarchies
Former monarchies of Asia
Former Russian protectorates
History of Bukhara
Mongol dynasties
Subdivisions of the Russian Empire
States and territories established in 1785
States and territories disestablished in 1920
Turkic dynasties
History of Uzbekistan